Lace Crater is a 2015 American comedy film written and directed by Harrison Atkins; the film marks his first feature full-length film. The film stars Lindsay Burdge, Peter Vack, Chase Williamson, Joe Swanberg, Jennifer Kim, Keith Poulson and Andrew Ryder. The film had its world premiere on September 15, 2015 in the Vanguard section of the 2015 Toronto International Film Festival. The film had its American premiere at the Cucalorus Film Festival on November 13, 2015. The film was released in a  limited release and through video on demand  on July 29, 2016, by Invincible Pictures.

Plot
An awkward twenty-something begins to go through strange physical changes after a weekend tryst with a ghost.

Cast
 Lindsay Burdge as Ruth
 Peter Vack as Michael
 Joe Swanberg as Dean
 Chase Williamson as Ryan
 Jennifer Kim as Claudette
 Keith Poulson as Keith
 Andrew Ryder as Andrew

Production
Principal photography began on November 30, 2014, and concluded on December 21, 2014.

Release
On September 11, 2015, a teaser trailer from the film was released. The film had its world premiere at the 2015 Toronto International Film Festival on September 15, 2015. It also screened at the Sitges Film Festival on October 15, 2015. It had its American premiere at the Cucalorus Film Festival on November 13, 2015. The film was released on July 29, 2016.

References

External links
 

2015 films
2015 comedy films
American comedy films
American ghost films
2010s ghost films
2010s English-language films
2010s American films